The 2018 UCI Junior Track Cycling World Championships was the annual Junior World Championship for track cycling held at the World Cycling Centre in Aigle, Switzerland from 15 to 19 August 2018.

Schedule
The schedule of events was as follows:

Medal summary

Notes 
 Competitors named in italics only participated in rounds prior to the final.
 In the qualifying round, Thomas Cornish clocked a 1:00.498 WJR.
 In the qualifying round, Lev Gonov clocked a 3:11.143 WJR.
 In the qualifying round, Lea Friedrich clocked a 33.922 WJR.

Medal table

References

External links
Official website

UCI Juniors Track World Championships
UCI Junior Track Cycling World Championships
UCI Junior Track Cycling World Championships
2018 UCI Junior Track Cycling World Championships
UCI Junior Track Cycling World Championships